Tetrarhanis rougeoti is a butterfly in the family Lycaenidae. It is found in Gabon, the Republic of the Congo and Equateur in the Democratic Republic of the Congo. The habitat consists of primary forests.

References

Butterflies described in 1954
Poritiinae